Driss Ksikes (born 1968 in Casablanca) is a Moroccan journalist.

Career
He had been an editor-in-chief of the francophone Tel Quel magazine. In 2006, he left TelQuel to be the editor-in-chief and director of publication of the arabophone and darijophone Nichane magazine. Ksikes wrote two plays ( "Ils" and " Le Saint des Incertains" and published a novel: Ma boite noire.

His article "L’image (délicate) des Prophètes" was the subject to several complaints of antisemitism in Belgium and France whereby he accused the Jews to have as religion business and politics.

In December 2006, Ksikes and another journalist, Sanaa al-Aji, were prosecuted for "defaming Islam and damaging morality" after the publication of a subject treating the Moroccan Humour. The religious sides of some first time published jokes  referring to the Islamic religion, Muhammad and Hassan II, the late king of Morocco. He received a three-year suspended sentence and was ordered to pay fines of $8,000. He has also been banned from working for two months.

See also
Ahmed Benchemsi
Ali Anouzla
Aboubakr Jamai
Ali Lamrabet

References

Novel by Driss Ksikes: Ma boîte noire, ed. Le Grand Souffle Ed., Paris, France, 2006, 

Moroccan male journalists
Moroccan dramatists and playwrights
Moroccan novelists
Moroccan male writers
Male novelists
Moroccan writers in French
Living people
Moroccan magazine editors
People from Casablanca
1968 births